Inger Christensen (16 January 1935 – 2 January 2009) was a Danish poet, novelist, essayist and editor. She is considered the foremost Danish poetic experimentalist of her generation.

Life and work
Born in the town of Vejle, on the eastern Jutland coast of Denmark, Christensen's father was a tailor, and her mother a cook before her marriage. After graduating from Vejle Gymnasium, she moved to Copenhagen and, later, to Århus, studying at the Teachers’ College there. She received her certificate in 1958. During this same period, Christensen began publishing poems in the journal Hvedekorn, and was guided by the noted Danish poet and critic Poul Borum (1934–1995), whom she married in 1959 and divorced in 1976.

After teaching at the College for Arts in Holbæk from 1963 to 1964, she turned to writing full-time, producing two of her major early collections, Lys (Light, 1962) and Græs (Grass, 1963), both examining the limits of self-knowledge and the role of language in perception. Her most acclaimed work of the 1960s, however, was It (det), which, on one level, explored social, political and aesthetic issues, but more deeply probed large philosophical questions of meaning. The work, almost incantatory in tone, opposes issues such as fear and love and power and powerlessness.

In these years Christensen also published two novels, Evighedsmaskinen (1964) and
Azorno (1967), as well as a shorter fiction on the Italian Renaissance painter Mantegna, presented from the viewpoint of various narrators (Mantegna's secretary Marsilio, the Turkish princess Farfalla, and Mantagena's young son), Det malede Værelse (1976, translated into English as The Painted Room by Harvill Press in 2000).

Much of Christensen's work was organized upon “systemic” structures in accordance with her belief that poetry is not truth and not even the “dream” of truth, but “is a game, maybe a tragic game—the game we play with a world that plays its own game with us.”

In the 1981 poetry collection Alfabet, Christensen used the alphabet (from a ["apricots"] to n  ["nights"]) along with the Fibonacci mathematical sequence in which the next number is the sum of the two previous ones (0, 1, 1, 2, 3, 5, 8, 13, 21, 34...). As she explained: "The numerical ratios exist in nature: the way a leek wraps around itself from the inside, and the head of a snowflower, are both based on this series." Her system ends on the n, suggesting many possible meanings including “n’s” significance as any whole number. As with It, however, despite its highly structured elements this work is a poetically evocative series concerned with oppositions such as an outpouring of the joy of the world counterposed with the fears for and forces poised for its destruction.

Sommerfugledalen of 1991 (Butterfly Valley: A Requiem, 2004) explores through the sonnet structure the fragility of life and mortality, ending in a kind of transformation.

Christensen also wrote works for children, plays, radio pieces, and numerous essays, the most notable of which were collected in her book Hemmelighedstilstanden (The State of Secrecy) in 2000.

Awards and honors
In 1978, she was appointed to the Royal Danish Academy; in 1994, she became a member of the Académie Européenne de Poésie ("European Academy of Poetry"); in 2001, a member of the Academy of Arts, Berlin. She won the Grand Prix des Biennales Internationales de Poésie in 1991; She received the Rungstedlund Award in 1991. Der österreichische Staatspreis für Literature ("Austrian State Prize for European Literature") in 1994; in 1994, she won the Swedish Academy Nordic Prize, known as the 'little Nobel'; the European Poetry Prize in 1995; The America Award in 2001; the German Siegfried Unseld Preis in 2006; and received numerous other distinctions. Her works have been translated into several languages, and she was frequently mentioned as a candidate for the Nobel Prize in literature.

Works
Years link to corresponding "[year] in poetry" article for books of poems, or "[year] in literature" for other literary works:
 1962: Lys: digte ("Light"), poems  
 1963: Græs: digte ("Grass"), poems
 1964: Evighedsmaskinen, ("Eternity Machine"), novel 
 1967: Azorno, novel (translated into English by Denise Newman; New Directions, 2009) 
 1969: det, ("it"), poems 1969 (translated into English by Susanna Nied) 
 1972: Intriganterne ("The Scheming"), play
 1976: Det malede værelse ("The Painted Room: A Tale of Mantua"), novel (translated into English by Denise Newman; Harvill Press, 2000) 
 1979: Brev i april ("Letter in April"), poems 
 1979: Den historie der skal fortælles
 1981: Alfabet, 1981 - "Alphabet", poems (translated into English by Susanna Nied), twice translated into Swedish 
 1982: Del af labyrinten ("Part of the Maze"), essays 
 1982: Den store ukendte rejse ("The Big Unknown Journey"), children's book  
 1987: En vinteraften i Ufa og andre spil ("A Winter Evening in Ufa"), plays 
 1989: Digt om døden ("Poem on Death") 
 1989: Lys og Græs ("Light and Grass"), poetry 
 1990: Mikkel og hele menageriet (illustrated by Lillian Brøgger) children's book
 1991: Sommerfugledalen, ("Butterfly Valley: A Requiem"), poems (translated into English by Susanna Nied) 
 1998: Samlede digte ("Collected Poems")
 2000: Hemmelighedstilstanden ("The State of Secrecy"), essays

Musical settings
The complete "Butterfly valley" has been set twice by two Danish composers, Niels Rosing-Schow and Svend Nielsen. Both versions were, separately, recorded by Ars Nova Copenhagen with poetry reading by the poet.

References

External links
 
Poem of Christensen painted on a wall in Copenhagen
Obituary in The Independent by Marcus Williamson

1935 births
2009 deaths
People from Vejle Municipality
Danish women poets
Danish women novelists
Danish essayists
Danish women essayists
20th-century Danish poets
20th-century Danish novelists
20th-century Danish women writers
20th-century essayists
Burials at the Garrison Cemetery, Copenhagen